Josef Machaň (11 February 1906 – 7 July 1979) was a Czech athlete. He competed in the men's long jump and the men's high jump at the 1924 Summer Olympics.

References

External links
 

1906 births
1979 deaths
Athletes (track and field) at the 1924 Summer Olympics
Czech male long jumpers
Czech male high jumpers
Olympic athletes of Czechoslovakia
Sportspeople from Pardubice